Jaden Amere Hardy (born July 5, 2002) is an American professional basketball player for the Dallas Mavericks of the National Basketball Association (NBA). He was a consensus five-star recruit and one of the top players in the 2021 class.

Early life and high school career
Hardy and his family moved to Nevada from Detroit prior to high school. He attended Coronado High School in Henderson, Nevada. As a junior, Hardy averaged 30.4 points, 9.1 rebounds and 8.4 assists per game, earning Nevada Gatorade Player of the Year and Las Vegas Review-Journal Boys Athlete of the Year honors. On January 8, 2021, he opted out from the remainder of his senior season. He was named to the rosters for the McDonald's All-American Game, Jordan Brand Classic and Nike Hoop Summit.

Recruiting
Hardy was a consensus five-star recruit and one of the top players in the 2021 class. Most recruiting analysts predicted that he would play professionally instead of attending college, with Kentucky and UCLA being his most likely college destinations. On May 15, 2021, he announced that he would join the NBA G League, forgoing college basketball. He chose the G League over offers from Kentucky and UCLA, among others.

Professional career

NBA G League Ignite (2021–2022) 
On June 9, 2021, Hardy signed with the NBA G League Ignite, a developmental team affiliated with the NBA G League. He averaged 17.7 points, 4.6 rebounds and 3.2 assists per game, shooting 35.1 percent from the field.

Dallas Mavericks (2022–present)  
Hardy was drafted 37th in the 2022 NBA draft by the Sacramento Kings and traded on draft night to the Dallas Mavericks. He joined the Mavericks for the 2022 NBA Summer League. On July 7, 2022, Hardy made his Summer League debut against the Chicago Bulls with 28 points, four rebounds, three assists, and one steal in a 100–99 loss. On February 6, 2023, he scored a career-high 29 points in a 124–111 win over the Utah Jazz. On March 11, Hardy started his first game in the NBA, recording 22 points, two rebounds and three assists in a 112–108 loss to the Memphis Grizzlies.

Personal life
Hardy's older brother, Amauri, played college basketball for UNLV and the University of Oregon. His father, Ramsey, was on Tuskegee University's basketball team.

References

External links
USA Basketball bio

2002 births
Living people
21st-century African-American sportspeople
African-American basketball players
Basketball players from Detroit
Dallas Mavericks players
McDonald's High School All-Americans
NBA G League Ignite players
Sacramento Kings draft picks
Shooting guards